"Destino o Casualidad" is a song by Spanish singer Melendi featuring American duo Ha*Ash. It was released on June 2, 2017 as the third single from his eighth studio album Quítate las Gafas (2017) and then included on Ha*Ash's live album Ha*Ash: En Vivo (2019).

Music video 
The music video for "Destino o Casualidad" was directed by Willy Rodríguez. Filming took place in 2017 in New York. , the video has over 440 million views on YouTube.

The second video for "Destino o Casualidad", recorded live for Ha*Ash's live album Ha*Ash: En Vivo, was released on December 6, 2019. The video was filmed in Auditorio Nacional, Mexico City.

Live performances 
Melendi and Ha*Ash performed "Destino o Casualidad" live together for the first time at the concert in Buenos Aires, Argentina on June 2, 2017. They performed together again on Santiago, Chile on June 3, 2017 and City Mexico, Mexico on November 11, 2017.

Track listings
Digital download
 Destino o Casualidad  – 4:18

Charts

Certifications

Release history

References 

Melendi songs
Ha*Ash songs
2017 songs
2017 singles
Spanish-language songs
Sony Music Latin singles